Steel Creek is a  long tributary of the Niobrara River in Knox County, Nebraska.

Course
Steel Creek rises on the North Branch Verdigre Creek divide about 2 miles northwest of Star, Nebraska in Holt County and then flows northeast into Knox County to join the Niobrara River about 5 miles east of Redbird, Nebraska.

Watershed
Steel Creek drains  of area, receives about 25.00 in/year of precipitation, has a wetness index of 448.54, and is about 10.86% forested.

See also

List of rivers of Nebraska

References

Rivers of Holt County, Nebraska
Rivers of Knox County, Nebraska
Rivers of Nebraska